The 1953 National League Division Two was the eighth post-war season of the second tier of motorcycle speedway in Great Britain.

Summary
The League was reduced at the start of the season again to 10 teams with Oxford Cheetahs dropping down to the Southern League whilst Ashfield closed and Liverpool folded mid-season. Cradley Heath 'merged' with Wolverhampton from the Southern League but used the Wolverhampton Wasps moniker, so to all intents and purposes they had closed.

Coventry Bees clinched their first title by a single point.

Wolverhampton rider Mike Rogers died on 6 June 1953, the day after receiving critical injuries at Monmore Green Stadium racing against Liverpool. The 22-year-old lost control of his bike and fell heavily before being transported to the Royal Hospital in Wolverhampton.

Final table

Liverpool Chads withdrew mid-season - record expunged.

Top Five Riders (League only)

See also
List of United Kingdom Speedway League Champions
Knockout Cup (speedway)

References

Speedway National League Division Two
1953 in British motorsport
1953 in speedway